God & Guns is the thirteenth studio album by the southern rock band Lynyrd Skynyrd, released on September 29, 2009.

The single "Still Unbroken" was released on July 27, 2009 followed by another track, "Simple Life", on August 4, 2009. "Still Unbroken" was written after the death of original bassist Leon Wilkeson in 2001. It was the theme song of WWE’s Breaking Point PPV event and is featured on WWE SmackDown vs. Raw 2010.

"God & Guns" was the last Lynyrd Skynyrd album to feature the band's longtime keyboardist Billy Powell, who died in January 2009. Ean Evans, who had replaced Leon Wilkeson on bass, also died before this album came out. The late Hughie Thomasson (Dec. 2007) had contributed to the writing of many songs, but recording did not begin until 2008 and he does not play on the album. This album is the first with guitarist Mark Matejka. The album features guitar work from John 5.

Although neither was present on the album, the CD booklet contains a picture of the group with the two new members: Peter Keys on keyboards and Robert Kearns on bass.

The album's title comes from its eighth track, "God & Guns", written by Mark Stephen Jones, Travis Meadows and Bud Tower, which was later covered by Hank Williams Jr. for his 2016 album It's About Time. The lyrical shift from "Saturday Night Special" to "God & Guns" has been taken into account by band member Johnny Van Zant, who explained how the song was not a direct contradiction to "Saturday Night Special."

God & Guns peaked at #18 on the U.S. Billboard pop charts, the band's highest-charting studio album since 1977's Street Survivors. As of 2012, the album has sold 182,000 copies in the United States.

Track listing
"Still Unbroken" (Rickey Medlocke, Gary Rossington, Hughie Thomasson, Johnny Van Zant) – 5:06
"Simple Life" (Medlocke, Rossington, Jeffrey Steele, J. Van Zant, Hughie Thomasson) – 3:17
"Little Thing Called You" (John Lowery, Medlocke, Rossington, J. Van Zant) – 3:58
"Southern Ways" (Lowery, Bob Marlette, Medlocke) – 3:48
"Skynyrd Nation" (Lowery, Marlette, Medlocke, J. Van Zant) – 3:52
"Unwrite That Song" (Medlocke, Tony Mullins, Rossington, Steele, J. Van Zant) – 3:50
"Floyd" (Lowery, Medlocke, Rossington, J. Van Zant) – 4:03
"That Ain't My America" (Medlocke, Rossington, J. Van Zant, Brad Warren, Brett Warren) – 3:44
"Comin' Back for More" (Blair Daly, Medlocke, Rossington, J. Van Zant) – 3:28
"God & Guns" (Mark Stephen Jones, Travis Meadows, Bud Tower) – 5:44
"Storm" (Lowery, Marlette, Medlocke, Rossington, J. Van Zant) – 3:15
"Gifted Hands" (Lowery, Marlette, Medlocke, Rossington, J. Van Zant) – 5:22

Special Edition Disc 2
"Bang Bang" (Trey Bruce, Medlocke, Rossington, J. Van Zant) – 3:10
"Raining in My Heartland" (Bruce, Medlocke, Rossington, J. Van Zant) – 3:54
"Hobo Kinda Man" (Bruce, Medlocke, Rossington, J. Van Zant) – 3:53
"Red, White, & Blue" (Live) (Donnie Van Zant, J. Van Zant, Brad Warren, Brett Warren) – 5:42
"Call Me the Breeze" (Live) (J.J. Cale) – 5:49
"Sweet Home Alabama" (Live) (Ed King, Rossington, Ronnie Van Zant) – 6:25

Live Tracks Recorded 6/15/2007 at the Freedom Hall in Louisville, KY

Personnel
Lynyrd Skynyrd
Johnny Van Zant – lead vocals, harmonica
Gary Rossington – guitars
Rickey Medlocke – guitars, backing vocals, co-lead vocals on "Skynyrd Nation", harmonica
Mark Matejka – guitars, backing vocals
Ean Evans – bass, backing vocals
Michael Cartellone – drums
Billy Powell – keyboards

Additional personnel
John 5 – guitars
Rob Zombie – vocals on "Floyd"
Michael Rhodes – bass
Greg Morrow – drums
Perry Coleman – background vocals
Jerry Douglas – dobro
Bob Marlette – piano
The Honkettes (Dale Krantz-Rossington & Carol Chase) – backing vocals
Strings on "Unwrite That Song" and "Gifted Hands" arranged by Lisa Parade

Charts

References

Lynyrd Skynyrd albums
2009 albums
Roadrunner Records albums